Msgr. Dr. José Alfonso Belloso y Sánchez (30 October 1873 – 9 August 1938) was the sixth Bishop and  second Archbishop of San Salvador, El Salvador.

External links
Catholic-hierarchy.org entry on Alfonso Belloso

20th-century Roman Catholic archbishops in El Salvador
Roman Catholic archbishops of San Salvador
1873 births
1938 deaths